Washington Benavides (3 March 1930 – 24 September 2017) was a Uruguayan poet, profesor and musician.

Writing career
Benavides was born in Tacuarembó, Uruguay. During the 1950s, Benavides contributed to the magazine Asir. In 1955, he published his first book , a satire of various personalities in his native city. After that he devoted himself heavily to poetry, eventually earning himself a place among the most important Uruguayan poets of his generation. During the dictatorship of Juan María Bordaberry, he promoted the revolutionary possibilities of popular music.

Benavides taught literature at the secondary level. He later joined the Faculty of Humanities and Educational Sciences in the Department of Modern and Contemporary Letters of the University of the Republic, Uruguay. He also worked in radio broadcasting. His poems have been set to music by Daniel Viglietti, Alfredo Zitarrosa, Héctor Numa Moraes, and Eduardo Darnauchans, such as in the songs "", Bismark Vega "", "", "", "", and "".

Washington died in Montevideo, Uruguay on 24 September 2017 at the age of 87.

Works 
 (1955)
 (1959)
 (1962)
 (1963)
 (1966)
 (1968)
 (1968)
 (1971)
 (1975)
 (1979)
 (1981)
 (1985)
 (1986)
 (1990)
 (1991)
 (1993) -Premio Nacional y Municipal-
 (1994)
 (1995)
 (1998)
 (2000)
 (2000)
 (2001)
 (2004)
 (2006)

External links

 Songs and milongas by Washington Benavides 
El frasco azul y otros frascos. Ediciones Abrelabios 
Washington Benavides recorded at the Library of Congress for the Hispanic Division's audio literary archive on June 16, 1977
Contemporary Uruguayan Poetry: A Bilingual Anthology by Ronald Haladyna includes several poems by Benavides followed by English translations.

References

1930 births
2017 deaths
People from Tacuarembó
Uruguayan people of Spanish descent
20th-century Uruguayan poets
Uruguayan male poets
Uruguayan musicians
Academic staff of the University of the Republic (Uruguay)
20th-century Uruguayan male writers
Premio Bartolomé Hidalgo